Bunker is a fictional superhero of Mexican descent, published by DC Comics. He first appeared in Teen Titans vol. 4, #1 (November 2011), and was created by Scott Lobdell and Brett Booth.

Booth said on his blog:

Fictional character biography
Bunker first appeared as a member of the Teen Titans in Teen Titans vol. 4, #1, as part of The New 52, a reboot of DC's continuity and timeline.

Raised in the small Mexican village called 'El Chilar', Miguel Jose Barragan had grown up in a loving and supportive community, and found acceptance as an openly gay teenager. When Miguel manifested the meta-human ability to create psionic energy constructs, the extroverted idealist sought out Red Robin in an attempt to become a full-fledged superhero.
 
Miguel – who adopts the code-name "Bunker" – then becomes a target of N.O.W.H.E.R.E., a mysterious organization abducting super-powered youths for their own nefarious purposes. Red Robin makes contact with Bunker, and soon organizes a group of targeted teenagers into a meta-human resistance force known as the 'Teen Titans'. Together, they are able to liberate the living weapon known as Superboy and dismantle N.O.W.H.E.R.E.’s secret complex in the Antarctic.

In July 2012, Lobdell announced that he was going to reveal Bunker's boyfriend, "who will be heading to the US from Mexico after coming out of a coma and learning that his boyfriend had run off to become a superhero".

In issue #23, Bunker leaves the team for a short while. The Teen Titans series then concluded, with #30 along with an annual in April 2014. The series was later relaunched in July with a new issue #1, written by Will Pfeifer and art by Kenneth Rocafort.

In the annual, during an epilogue, Bunker is shown being funded by the Green Team to create the 'Spectacular Internationale'.

Powers and abilities
Bunker has the ability to create energy constructs with his mind, often creating brick-like walls and pummeling fists. His constructs manifest as purple bricks. He has full control over their density, being able to make them soft to cushion impacts or falls, or hard as rock to inflict damage. He can create a wide variety of shapes including pillars, shields, body armor, platforms to levitate himself and others, etc. He has also been shown launching his bricks as projectiles. 

Arsenal in Red Hood and the Outlaws #16 said: "This Bunker reminds me of me in a way. He acts like he doesn't take any of it too seriously. But a wall like that doesn't come out of thin air. He's got more going on than anyone gives him credit for. You watch-- he'll be in the Justice League before he's twenty".

In other media
Bunker appears in DC Super Hero Girls, as one of the background students at Super Hero High.

Merchandising
In 2013, a HeroClix figure of Bunker was produced as part of the Teen Titans set.

External links 
 Character profile at TitansTower.com

References

Characters created by Scott Lobdell
Characters created by Tony S. Daniel
Characters created by Brett Booth
Comics characters introduced in 2011
DC Comics LGBT superheroes
Fictional gay males
DC Comics metahumans
Fictional characters with energy-manipulation abilities
Mexican superheroes